The National Museum of History of Azerbaijan is the largest museum in Azerbaijan. It is located in Baku, in the former residential house of Azerbaijani oil magnate and philanthropist Haji Zeynalabdin Taghiyev. The museum was founded in 1920, following the Russian takeover of Baku, and opened to visitors in 1921.

History 
The museum's building was constructed between 1893 and 1902. It was designed by Polish architect Józef Gosławski, in imitation of the Italian Renaissance style. It is large in size, stretching over an entire block and reaching four floors in some parts.  
When the Red Army entered Baku in April 1920, Taghiyev's residence was immediately confiscated. Under a resolution of the USSR People's Commissariat, the residence was established as a museum in June 1920, just two months after the Bolsheviks took Baku.
In May 1934, a special order was adopted to improve the teaching of history and geography in schools, or, more precisely, to inculcate the 'advantages' of a socialist society in its members in order to nurture the rising generation in the ideology of the totalitarian regime. A Marxist interpretation of history was delivered via the establishment of historical research and other institutions. In addition, new kinds of historical and regional museums were created to inspire the teaching and promotion of history.

The network of museums with a historical profile was enlarged in regard to the new system. Furthermore, mechanisms of Soviet advocacy became much stronger during this period.

Knowledge of Azerbaijan's history was developed through the museum's research. The foundations for the scientific investigation of ancient material and cultural monuments of Azerbaijan were laid in the period from 1925 to the 1960s. This was under the direction of archaeologists such as Davud Sharifov, Yevgeniy Pakhomov, Ishak Jafar-Zadeh, Movsum Salamov, Saleh Gaziyev, Mammadali Huseynov. Excavations were carried out in Khojaly, Qabala, Ganja, Kharaba Gilan, Orangala, Mingechevir and other places. The museum's collections consist of materials discovered during these excavations and from other ethnographic expeditions.

The building 
The building was the residential house of a well-known entrepreneur and philanthropist Haji Zeynal Abdin Taghiyev and his family. The mansion was esteemed as one of the beautiful buildings built under the designs of Józef Goslavsky (1865–1904), who was the chief architect of the city of Baku during the time.
Goslavsky had been sent to Baku in 1891 as a specialist in supervising the construction of the Alexander Nevsky Cathedral in Baku. He was the chief architect of the city in 1893–1904. In Baku there are twelve remaining architectural buildings built based on Goslavsky's designs. The mansion of Haji Zeynal Abdin Taghiyev was constructed in 1895–1901. This three-story mansion with huge domes overlooks to Baryatinsky Street (now A. Alizade Street), Polis Street (now Y. Mammadaliyev Street), Mercury Street (now Z. Aliyeva Street), and its facade overlooks to Gorchakov Street (H. Z. Tagiyev Street).

Two-row construction of the rooms is the basis of interior design of the mansion. The reception room and the living room are divided into groups around two enclosed courtyards. The front part of the building with two separate marble stairs overlooks to the West. There is a European hall decorated with floral pilasters in the enfilade of the second floor. The Eastern hall is distinguished by its magnificence, splendor, and delicacy of ornaments. A winter garden with a small fountain in its center was attached to the Eastern hall. The study of H.Z.A. Taghiyev, dining room, living room and other rooms were decorated with oak wood. The ceiling of the original boudoir of Haji's wife Sona Khanum was designed with figured mirror plates.

Some 270 engineers, architects, carpenter, painters, and other masters worked in the construction of the Taghiyev's mansion. All the equipment in the mansion was brought from Russia, France, America, and Germany. Heating and cooling systems were installed in the mansion. The mansion has three-stories on all four sides, and the height of each room reaches 1320 meters. The columns of the mansion were decorated with diamond and colored mirror glass, the floor was laid with natural colored birch planks. Some 1.2 million roubles was spent on only the construction of the building (excluding furniture and equipment brought from abroad).

There was Taghiyev's office and other rooms on the ground floor, living quarters, and a study and two halls – European and Eastern halls – as well as two rooms with safe, utility rooms, a kitchen, a bathroom, among others, were located on the second floor. The third floor with a separate exit to Y. Mammadaliyev Street consists of 16 rooms. Since 1914, Baku Commercial Bank, which was headed by H.Z. Taghiyev, had been situated in the mansion.

On the second floor of Taghiyev's residence there are two large ballrooms. One is based on Oriental designs (Mauritanian) style and the other in a Western style. The Oriental Room features enormous plate glass windows, gilded arches, highly decorated walls, ceilings, and chandeliers. The lines in the Occidental Room are more perpendicular to each other.

According to photographs that are about 90 years old, one of the most elaborate rooms in the original building was Taghiyev's wife's boudoir (private sitting room). All the movable furniture and paintings in this room have since disappeared; nothing remains except the ornate mirrored mosaic ceiling. During the Soviet period, four layers of white paint were applied over the highly decorative floral designs on the walls. Still in the main halls of the residence, the original paint has withstood the test of time incredibly well. The paint was made of finely ground eggshell as was the practice of artists of Byzantine icons. Nearly 100 years later, the original colors with their subtlety and sophistication have neither faded nor chipped.

The Bolsheviks, who seized the power in Azerbaijan in April 1920, confiscated the Taghiyev's mansion, and the State Historical Museum started operating there. During 1941–1954, the Museum of History was moved to the Palace of the Shirvanshahs, and the Council of People's Commissars of Azerbaijan SSR was in the mansion. The Museum of History began functioning again on the second floor of the mansion in 1954. The Archive of Technical and Medical Documents was on the ground floor. Only in 2000, the whole mansion was totally given to the authority of the Museum of History of Azerbaijan.

The Taghiyev's mansion was reconstructed several times. During the renovation in the middle of the 20th century, drawings in the mirrored room were destroyed as "bourgeois remains" and were covered with plaster. Those wall paintings were uncovered under the layer of plaster during the renovation in 2000. Despite the four layers of paint on them, the paintings have not lost their freshness.

Fundamental renovation, restoration, and reconstruction works commenced in the Taghiyev's mansion in 2005. The Memorial Museum of H.Z. Taghiyev under the National Museum of History of Azerbaijan was also established on the initiative of the president of the Republic of Azerbaijan Ilham Aliyev.

Memorial museum of Haji Zeynal Abdin Taghiyev 
Restoration of rooms, personal belongings, and furniture of the Memorial museum of H. Z.A. Taghiyev has been organized by specialists from Azerbaijan and Italy, based on the family photo-album they managed to restore the previous interior of the rooms.

The Memorial museum includes: 1) the Taghiyev's study, 2) Oriental Hall, 3) a library 4) a billiard room, 5) a dining room, 6) a monitored room, 7) a boudoir, 8) a bedroom, 9) a dressing room.

The exposition of the Memorial museum begins with the Taghiyev's study. The study was notable for its stark beauty. Its walls have been decorated with patterned green wallpaper and redwood. Besides the furniture that belonged to Taghiyev there is a bookcase, a writing desk, an armchair, a chair, a cupboard, as well as some other belongings, restored by the help of restorers based on his old family photo-album. Code of laws of the Russian Empire, reference-books and encyclopedias are collected books from his private library in the bookcase. Every morning Taghiyev's secretaries read him periodic literature of local, Russian, European as well as Eastern press discussing the most important articles and information. Behind the writing desk on the wall there are canvases from his private collection of paintings, portraits of Iranian rulers – Nadir shah- Afshar and Fatali-shah Gadjar, on the left side- the portraits of the Russian emperor Nicholas II and his wife Alexandra Fedorovna. Opposite the windows of the study there is a canvas painted by Ayvazovsky "Storm in the Sea". The painting that depicts H.Z.A. Taghiyev's meeting with Muzaffar-ad-Din Qajar, Shah of Iran, now is in the same place as during Taghiyev's period.

There is a portrait of H.Z.A. Taghiyev in front of the writing-table. It was a decision of the city council to order a portrait of H.Z.A. Taghiyev for his contribution and financial aid to the construction of technical college in Baku. The portrait was painted by a well-known artist I. Brodsky in 1912. H.Z.A. Taghiyev was depicted with all medals and orders. Included among them are Russian orders of Saint Stanislav, three golden medals "For diligence", Iranian order "Shiri- Khurshid" ("Lion and Sun") and Bukhara "Golden star".

Following the study, there is an Oriental hall. The Oriental hall as palace's one of the biggest halls combines ancient oriental ornaments famed for their beauty and grandeur. Official meetings, receptions and solemn ceremonies were held there. The doors of the Oriental hall were made of walnut, beech, and pear wood and the hall itself was decorated artistically. There are openwork tables, chairs, armchairs, a grand piano and so on. The ceiling was decorated with Kuran ayats. Nine kilograms of gold were used for inscription and decoration.

A huge chandelier and sconces above the mirrors illuminate the hall and increase its beauty. Inscription in Arabic on the windowpanes denote H.Z.A. Taghiyev's name and surname. Six-pointed stars interspersed in different parts of the hall and widespread in Muslim architecture, are in the form of Solomon's signet ring. According to belief, it protects a human from the evil eye. Arches in the upper part add additional beauty to the Oriental hall.

Passing through the arches, there is H.Z.A. Taghiyev's library. H.Z.A. Taghiyev made great efforts for prosperity of enlightenment. Works of prominent writers, poets, and historians were published at the expense of H.Z.A. Taghiyev. Taghiyev owned a newspaper "Kaspi" and he was the first to publish Koran in Azerbaijani at its publishing house. He made great efforts for the establishment and subsequent activity of philanthropic societies including "Nashri- maarif" and "Nidjat".

There is a set of furniture, two wooden tables, chairs, armchairs, and bookcases. Code of laws of the Russian Empire is kept in the bookcases. A carpet and curtains adorn the room.

The door on the right of the library leads to the billiard room. There is a billiard table in the middle of the room. A leather high back sofa and armchairs were meant for rest. A chandelier in special shape adorns the room.

When going out of the billiard room and the library, you enter the arched nook again. The door on the left leads to the dining-room. The walls were upholstered with panne. There is a right-angled table and velvet-covered chairs. A silver-enamelled dinner set which was a present of Bukhara emir is on the table. The other dinner set, cut glass goblets, and silver knives with H.Z.A. Taghiyev's monogram brought by him from France are in the cupboard. There is a large ornamented sideboard made of walnut in the room.

The door on the left of the canteen leads into a room with an interactive table. There is information on entrepreneurship and public activity of H.Z. Taghiyev, his family and his charitable activities across Azerbaijan and beyond its boundaries on the large-scale touch screen in the new exposition of the Memorial Museum. The information is presented in three languages: Azerbaijani, English, and Russian. One of the advantages of the interactive table is that four visitors can get acquainted with the information mentioned there simultaneously.

To the left from this room there is a small sitting room of H.Z.A. Taghiyev's second wife, Sona khanim. Haji married a second time after Zeynab khanim's death. From his first marriage with Zeynab khanim, Taghiyev had three children. Sona khanim was a daughter of general Balakishi bey Arablinski. They married in 1896. Despite forty years of disparity in age, it was a happy marriage. From this marriage, they had five children.

Sona khanim's small room differs from other rooms for its beauty and originality. The ceiling was covered with plate glass and walls were decorated with colorful ornaments. The room is also called the "mirror hall". There is an original round sofa in the middle of the room. It has a special place for lamp. There are quadrangular ornamented tables, soft chairs, and chairs.

A corridor following the sitting room leads to the bedroom. The bedroom consists of two parts separated from each other by a wooden ornamented partition. The first part includes a double bed and a cheval glass. In the second part there is a small circular table, a sofa, armchairs, and chairs. A carpet and curtains adorn the room.

There is a small room attached to the bedroom. It is a dressing room. It includes a vanity mirror, an easy chair, a table, and wardrobes. You can see adornments on the vanity mirror.

Directors of the Museum 
 1920 – 1921 – Stanevic Y.
 1921 – Savelyev S.
 1923 – Malikov Mammad
 1923 – Sheikh Ismail
 1923 – 1928 – Sharifov Davud
 1928 – 1932 – Manutsyan Sero
 1932 – 1934 – Melkumyan A.
 1934 – 1937 – Salamov M.
 1937 – Klimov A.
 1938 – 1939 – İshanov B.
 1939 – Leviatov V.N. (d.v.m.i.e.)
 1939 – Mehdiyev D.Q.
 1940 – 1942 – Aliyev Zeynal (d.v.m.i.e.)
 1942 – 1947 – Leviatov V.
 1947 – 1952 – Gaziyev Saleh
 1952 – 1953 – Jafarzadeh Ishaq
 1953 – Soxatskiy V.I. (d.v.m.i.e.)
 1953 – 1954 – Efendiyev Mammad
 1954 – 1961 – Gaziyev Mammad
 1961 – 1998 – Azizbeyova Pustakhanim
 1998 – Rajabli Ali
 1998 – Naila Valikhanli – to present

Museum's funds

Archaeological Fund 
The Archaeological Fund is one of the first structural divisions of the museum established by the name of "Archaeological section" in 1920 (the head was Yevgeni Pakhomov). During 1924–1930, the "Archaeology" subdivision operated under the department of History-Ethnography (Ishag Jafarzadeh had been its conservator since 1926). The department of History-Ethnography was dissolved by forming "the department of material culture of Azerbaijan" (scientific leader was A.R. Zifeldt-Simumyagi) as a result of reconstruction implemented in the museum in 1930–31; with the intention of founding Historical-Archaeological museum in the Palace of Khan (the Shirvanshahs), it was given an order on submitting archaeological materials particularly historical exhibits of the 16th–19th centuries to the Central Institution for Conservation of Monuments of Azerbaijan. In the consequence of the structural change carried out to incorporate the Museum to the Azerbaijani branch of the Academy of Sciences of the Union in 1936, the division of "History of Feudalism in Azerbaijan" under the leadership of V.N. Leviatov was formed and after a while, archaeological collection was gathered in the established Archaeological Fund. Since then, the Archaeological Fund had been under the historical departments of the museum and has been continuing its activity as an independent scientific-fund department since 2009.

Since the day of establishment, its major areas of activity are the study of the history, archaeological and cultural heritage of Azerbaijan and conservation of examples of material culture constituting this heritage in the frame of existing requirements. Beginning from the 1920s, employees of the department had actively participated in the field researching in different regions of Azerbaijan and broke new grounds in this direction. Thus, since there was not an institution to engage in archaeological research in 1920, the Museum took over this work and organized the first archaeological expedition to the Palace of the Shirvanshahs in July of the same year. The first official archaeological expedition was sent to Elisabethpol Ueyzd in 1921 and the excavations were carried out in seven kurgans located in three villages of the ueyzd. The initial excavations commenced to be implemented on the site named Shamir-valley in Nuzgar village (present-day Shamkir region) of Elisabethpol Ueyzd on 1 June. The research started in 1921 was also continued in 1922. This time, the expedition investigated the sites of "Hasan hill", "Khanlar hill" and "Gala" and registered the kurgans situated in these areas.

Another expedition was arranged to the regions of Azerbaijan in the middle of the 1920s. D. Sharifov undertook an expedition conducting archaeological research in Nukha Ueyzd (present-day Sheki)- ancient city of Gabala in 1925, in Yaloylutepe and mountainous part of Elisabethpol Ueyzd- Chovdar in 1926. The findings of those expeditions organized in the 1920s are still the most precious examples of the Archaeological Fund. V. Leviatov, A. Nuriyev, N.K. Minkevich, G. Ione, I. Sheblykin and others took part in the archaeological research carried out under the leadership of I. Jafarzadeh in Ancient Ganja in 1938 and gathered many materials concerning the 12th–13th centuries. Four settlements, 23 pottery kilns, 5 kurgans, more than 200 underground burials and over 300 jug burials, including other burial monuments: catacomb burials, stone box graves regarding different periods of history were investigated during the large-scale stationary archaeological excavations conducted under the leadership of archaeologist Saleh Gaziyev in Mingachevir during 1946–1953. In general, the archaeological excavations were performed in 3500 square meters area in Mingachevir and greater than 20 thousand examples of material culture were found. Thousands of discovered examples of material culture are presently preserved in the Archaeological Fund.

In the 1950-60s, G. Abilova and Sh. Sadikhzadeh made archaeological visits to regions with the purpose of studying archaeological heritage of Azerbaijan especially the monuments of Late Bronze-Early Iron Ages. During the archaeological investigations, numerous material samples of Khojaly-Gadabay culture were discovered and handed over to the Archaeological Fund for permanent preservation.

Another archaeological expedition under the museum was arranged during the years of 1968–1987. That expedition led by V.A. Kvachidze conducted underwater archaeological research mainly in the Caspian Sea. The expedition's findings, which are scientifically significant for the history of Azerbaijan, are kept in the Archaeological Fund.

At the present time, the number of examples of material culture being preserved in the fund is more than 50 thousand. Most of them are the archaeological materials of the excavations carried out in Mingachevir, Nakhchivan, Karabagh, Qazakh, Beylagan, Absheron, Mughan, Ganja and other regions. There are also many findings accidentally uncovered in the fund and the most valuable example is "Dolanlar" collection. A small part of the fund's materials consists of replicas and the examples of material culture obtained from personal collections. Those materials with various composition and usage purposes concerning the period from the Stone Age till the 19th century reflect economy, occupation, domestic life, religious and philosophical outlook, cultural and commercial relations, and martial work of our ancestors.

The archaeological samples were placed in the Fund and Electronic Database was formed based on necessary information about them. Electronic certification of the fund's materials has been started since 2008. This is being implemented in the special certification program created on the local network of the museum. Twenty-five percent of the fund's materials have already been certificated electronically.

The materials of the Archaeological Fund distinguished by their various contents and shapes have drawn the attention of researchers and became their research object. Up to now, a number of scientific-research works, brochures, booklets including the album of "Jug burials of Mingachevir" ("Mingəçevir küp qəbirləri") (1960), "Ancient Azerbaijani adornments" ("Qədim Azərbaycan bəzəkləri") (1971), "Atlantis of the Caspian Sea" ("Xəzər Atlantidası") (2009), "Anthropomorphic terracottas of Azerbaijan" ("Azərbaycanın antropomorf terrakotları") (2010), "Artistic metal of Shirvan" ("Şirvanın bədii metalı") (2012) and "Glazed vessels with zoomorphic description" ("Zoomorf təsvirli şirli qablar") (2016), "Davud bey Sharifov" ("Davud bəy Şərifov") (2016) and "Weapons of Ancient and Medieval periods of Azerbaijan" ("Azərbaycanın qədim və orta əsr silahları") (2018) book-albums, "Remnants of Caspian Atlantis" ("Xəzər Atlantidasının yadigarları") (2020) and "Magical lamp" ("Sehirli çıraq") (2020) booklets have been published, "The National Museum of History of Azerbaijan and our archaeological heritage" ("Milli Azərbaycan Tarixi Muzeyi və arxeoloji irsimiz") and "Ceramics of Ancient period of Azerbaijan-oenochoes" ("Azərbaycanın antik dövr keramikası-oynoxoyyalar") book-albums, "Faience toys" ("Saxsı oyuncaqlar") and "Misteroius potteries of Azerbaijan-spheroconuses" ("Azərbaycanın sirli saxsıları-sferokonuslar") catalogs have been prepared for publication. The fund's materials are the main source base of all the above-mentioned publications.

The fund was headed by Y. Pakhamov, I. Jafarzadeh, V. Leviatov, S. Gaziyev, M. Huseynova, Sh. Sadikhzade, G. Aghayev, and F. Khalili in different years. The current head of the scientific-fund department is Nasir Guluzade.

Patriotic War Fund 
The Fund of Patriotic War was established by the decision of Scientific Board of the National Museum of History of Azerbaijan in January 2021. 

The main purpose in founding the fund is collecting, preserving, researching and propagating clothes, memorabilia, documents and photographs belonging to our compatriots who were martyred and became veterans for the territorial integrity of Azerbaijan. The clothes and ideological means utilized by the forces of the Republic of Azerbaijan during the Patriotic War were also included in the fund. The Fund of Patriotic War which currently has more than a hundred inventories is being received new materials. Belongings and photographs of National Heroes of Azerbaijan- Major-General Polad Hashimov, Colonel Ilgar Mirzayev, Colonel Shukur Hamidov and Chingiz Gurbanov- are preserved in the fund. There are also items taken as the military loot from Armenian soldiers during the liberation of our lands by Azerbaijani Army are among the materials preserved in the Fund of Patriotic War. The head of the fund is Shafa Movsumov.

Ethnographic Fund 
Although the departments of Archaeology, History and Ethnography were initially supposed to be created in the Azerbaijan State Museum (the head was Y.A. Pakhomov) in accordance with the first "Regulation" of the museum-archive (Muzarxiv) adopted in 1920 and ethnographic materials obtained from different sources were collected in the department, the fundamental activities commenced following the adoption of the new "Resolution" of the museum in 1925 and ethnographic expeditions organized to Ganja and Nukha (Sheki), including Gurtgashen (Gabala), Vartashen (Oghuz) and Vardanli during 1925–1926. As a result of these visits, 155 exhibits were brought to the subdivision of Ethnography; according to the information from 1928, there were 606 ethnographic materials in the repository of the subdivision that was the predecessor of present-day Ethnographic Fund, of which the first exhibit was registered in 1926. 

In the same year, the department of History-Ethnography began to assemble materials in a bid to compile the ethnographic map of Azerbaijan. In 1929, after the reconstruction started in the previous year and the current renovation, a new subdivision, Modern household subdivision, was formed in the department of History and Ethnography (the head was N.N. Pchelin). The carpets called "The real masterpieces of Azerbaijani handicraftsmen" in the periodical press were demonstrated in the museum's exposition. However, the changes occurring in Soviet community led by totalitarian regime, discussions on tar (musical instrument), mugham (national music), veil, and hat, among others, also severely affected the structure and exposition of the museum; all the museum's materials were divided between two departments. The division of Farming and Handicraft village, which was adapted for modern era, of the department of Material Culture of Azerbaijan, in which the ethnographic materials also included, was headed by Maria Guliyeva, the division of Nomadic and Semi-nomadic economy was run by Ishag Jafarzadeh. Not properly studying the issues of history and ethnography of Azerbaijan at that time had also reflected itself in the ethnographic exposition.

The fundamental changes that the museum underwent in 1936– the Azerbaijan State Museum started operating under the name of Azerbaijan History Museum- made the Ethnographic Fund to be incorporated to the division of Feudalism History of Azerbaijan (the Head was V.N. Leviatov). During the years of intensive work, special attention was paid to collect ethnographic and historical materials to enrich the Funds. According to the information from 1 January 1939, there were 1676 exhibits in the Ethnographic Fund. More than 500 ethnographic exhibits concerning the history of Azerbaijan in the XIX century were displayed in the exhibition organized in the Palace of the Shirvanshahs, a branch of the museum, in those years. The fund designed 5 albums related to residential houses and embroideries of Azerbaijan in the 19th century and 13 albums of material and an elucidatory text were collected for the carpets and embroideries of Absheron. The ethnographic expeditions sent to Ganja and Shusha in 1938 obtained plenty of materials on the life and household of Azerbaijanis as well as ancient fabric, artistically valuable embroideries, the molds of silk kerchief and so on. According to the data from 1 December 1940, the number of exhibits preserved in the Ethnographic Fund had reached to 3057. The ethnographic expedition, in which B.O. Abdullayeva (the leader of the expedition) and the artist V. Sostrovens participated in 1941, enriched the fund with the materials collected from Barda, Agdam, Aghjabadi, Lachin including Nagorno-Karabakh. The fund already had 3498 exhibits in August 1943, in subsequent years, the museum continued making the ethnographic visits as well as doing the archaeological research. During those years, the head of the fund, Z. Kilchevskaiya, showed special activity in this work. Because of those visits, she made an article and an album on the embroideries of Azerbaijan in the 19th century and the articles concerning the description of male and female clothes of Karabakh including Shusha.

Nowadays, the Ethnographic Fund of the museum, which has been a structural unit of the Academy of Sciences of Azerbaijan SSR since the 1950s, is one of its richest Funds. Total number of the exhibits being preserved in the fund is 9047 depository items. The most ancient exhibits are a chandelier of the 12th century, a pestle, and a brazier. The exhibits such as copper vessels, silk fabric and woodworking samples relating to the XV-XVIII centuries and differing for their shapes and contents attract particular attention. The unique miniature embroidered on the silk fabric of the 17th century has caused great interest of specialists as well as visitors. Most of these materials are used to illuminate the history of the Safavids in the exposition. Majority of the exhibits being preserved in the fund and reflected all areas of household culture of Azerbaijani people pertain to the beginning of the XIX-XX centuries. Copper, faience, wood products, fabric and carpet samples maintaining production traditions of our nation are exceptionally scientific base for researching our national values. There are also preserved household belongings of ethnic minorities and different nations in the fund. Carpets and carpet products gifted to the Government, various organizations and the Museum in different periods are kept in the Ethnographic Fund. There is also a rich collection of national clothes that are the main indicators of material culture of Azerbaijani people. Male cloth with silver embroideries (chepken) of the XVIII century belonging to the Afshars, short-sleeved dress (bahari) of Karabakh relating to the 19th century, the clothes of Khurshud Banu Natavan and others have a great historical and artistic importance.

Beginning from the 1950s, the Department of Ethnography was headed by M. Guliyev, A. Abdullayev, A. Izmailova. Z.A. Kilchevskaya, M. Jabrailova, N. Mehdiyeva, A. Dadashova, and A. Rustambayova were conservators of the Ethnographic Fund within the Department of Ethnography. Since 2006, the department has been named "Ethnography scientific-fund department" and from that period till now, the head of the department is Gulzade Abdulova, and the head of the fund is S. Nasirova.

Along with cultural heritage samples obtained by the ways of collecting and purchasing in various years, the ethnographic expeditions carried out continually up to the present have played a necessary role in enriching the fund's materials. V.F. Trofimova, Z. Kilchevskaya, S. Gaziyev, H. Guliyev, A. Izmailova, and G. Abdulova had participated in those expeditions.

The fund's materials have widely been used to organize exhibitions pertaining to Azerbaijan in Norway, Germany (Dresden), Vatican, Ostrava and Prague cities of the Czech Republic. The materials of the fund were displayed in the exhibitions held in the museum such as "Caucasian Islamic Army-90" ("Qafqaz İslam ordusu-90") (2008), "Mugham world" ("Muğam aləmi") (2009), "Baku-the capital of Islamic culture" ("Bakı-İslam mədəniyyətinin paytaxtı") (2009), "Ancient cultural center of Azerbaijan-Karabakh" ("Azərbaycanın qədim mədəniyyət ocağı – Qarabağ") (2010), " Gems of the National Museum of History of Azerbaijan" ("Milli Azərbaycan Tarixi Muzeyinin inciləri") (2010), "The second life of Museum's items" ("Muzey əşyalarının ikinci həyatı") (2011), "Copper vessels of Azerbaijani table" ("Azərbaycan süfrəsinin mis qabları") (2013), "Arshin mal alan-100" ("Arşın mal alan – 100") (2013), "Gifts from friendly countries" ("Dost ellərin hədiyyələri") (2014), "Azerbaijani women's adornments" ("Azərbaycan qadın bəzəkləri"), "Oil chronicle of Azerbaijan" ("Azərbaycanın neft salnaməsi") (2014), "Shaki: ancient region maintaining our heritage" ("Şəki: irsimizi yaşadan ulu diyar") (2019), the exhibition "The Shirvanshah’s heritage in the world’s museums" ("Şirvanşahlar irsi dünya muzeylərində") (2019) organized in the Palace of the Shirvanshahs, the exhibition "The nation is grateful to you" ("Millət sizə minnətdardır") (2020) dedicated to the 75th anniversary of the Great Patriotic War.

The book-albums such as "Азербайджанские вышивки" (1970), "Ковры и ковровые изделия "(1970)," Азербайджанская национальная одежда" (1970), "Чеканные медные изделия" (1970), "Azerbaijani embroideries" ("Azərbaycan tikmələri") (1971), "National clothes of Azerbaijan" ("Azərbaycan milli geyimləri") (1972), "Khurshid Banu Natavan-180" ("Xurşid Banu Natəvan – 180") (2012), "Mirza Fatali Akhundzadeh-200" ("Mirzə Fətəli Axundzadə – 200") (2012), "Karabakh carpets" ("Qarabağ xalçaları") (2013), "Baku, Shirvan, Guba carpets" ("Bakı, Şirvan, Quba xalçaları") (2013), "Copper vessels of Azerbaijani table" ("Azərbaycan süfrəsinin mis qabları") (2013), "Clothing adornments of Azerbaijani women" ("Azərbaycan qadın geyim bəzəkləri") (2016), "Travel to the past way of life- perfumery, cosmetics, accessoires" ("Keçmiş məişətə səyahət – ətriyyat, kosmetika, aksesuarlar") (2018), "Beauty is ten" ("Gözəllik ondur") (2020) and the monography "National clothes of Azerbaijani men" ("Azərbaycan milli kişi geyimləri") (2020) on the fund's materials have been published.

Special Fund 
1690 exhibits (585 silver and 342 golden items and 763 golden coins) are preserved in the "Fund of Precious Metals" (present-time "Special Fund") established in 1955. Most of the items being preserved in the fund are male and female adornments, golden and silver archaeological items found in the territory of Azerbaijan (Shaki, Mingachevir, Nakhchivan, Beylagan, Gabala, Shamakhi, Aghsu, Baku, etc.), precious materials, golden coins as well as various household items (caskets, vases, saucers and so on) belonging to well-known people. A fragment of a lower mandible of an Azykhantrop, which is one of the most ancient and valuable exhibits of the museum, is preserved in this fund. In 2004, the first natural gold sample of Azerbaijan presented to the museum under the Order of President of the Republic of Azerbaijan Ilham Aliyev was also handed over to the fund.

The materials of the Special Fund were exhibited at numerous republican and international exhibitions, articles and booklets were published and speeches were made based on those materials. International exhibitions:

 90th anniversary of Hero of the Soviet Union Mehdi Huseynzade. 29 December 2008.
 The Mugham world-2009. The exhibition in the National Museum of History of Azerbaijan related to the International Mugham Festival. 17.03.2009.
 Baku is the capital of Islamic culture. 6 November 2009.
 The materials newly purchased for the museum, restored and conserved. 28 January 2010.
 Ancient cultural center of Azerbaijan- Karabakh. 3 June 2010.
 Pearls of the Museum. 13 October 2010.
 The second life of exhibits. 23 December 2011.
 Arshin mal alan-100. 20 February 2013.
 "Azerbaijan- Magical Land of Fire" the city of Prague. The following book-albums and catalogs were published on the basis of the fund's exhibits: Асланов Г.М., Голубкина Т.И., Садыхзаде Ш.Г. Каталог золoтых и серебряных предметов из археологических раскопок Азербай-джана, Баку: АН Азерб.ССР, 1966; the catalog "Gems of the collection of the National Museum of History of Azerbaijan" (2010), scientific catalogs Rustambayova A.M. "Archaeological silver and golden items" (2013) and "Golden coins of Muslim East" (2020). The fund was headed by Nina Shahramanova (1955–1956), Pustekhanim Azizbeyova (1956–1967), Maya Atakishiyeva (1967–1995), Atiga Izmailova (1995–2005). Since 2009, the fund has been leading by Afat Rustambayova. Since 2020, the foundation has been headed by Inara Muradalieva.

Fund of auxiliary historical materials 
A new fund of the same name was established in 1998 based on the non-coins collection of the Numismatic Fund, which has been operating in the National Museum of History of Azerbaijan since its creation. Badges, awards, stamps, banknotes, cards, and personal belongings, among others, kept in the Numismatic Fund were given to the non-coins fund. In 2009, the fund was called "Phaleristics and Glyptics" and given the content of the collection in the fund, it was renamed the Fund of "Auxiliary Historical Materials" in 2012.

Desktop memorial medals, orders, badges, tokens, and other signs are preserved in the fund's phaleristics collection, which consists of more than 30,000 depository items. Seals belonging to rulers and well-known people of the different periods, postal and railway seals, Russian and foreign stamps are in the collection of Glyptics of the Fund.

Banknotes and securities of the South Caucasus, the Russian Empire, the Azerbaijan Democratic Republic, the Soviet Union, the Republic of Azerbaijan, as well as various Eastern and Western countries are preserved in the bonistics collection of the fund.

There are Azerbaijani and foreign collections among philately materials of the fund.

Orders, medals and badges of the prominent scientists, doctors, educators, cultural and artistic figures, oil industry workers, deputies, workers, and other professionals are kept in the collection of special awards of the fund.

The materials of the fund are displayed in the museum's exposition, local and foreign international exhibitions, and other cultural events. In 2013, a book-album "Banknotes and securities in Azerbaijan" was published based on the fund's bonistics collection (designers: S. Gasimova and R. Ahmadov). In 2014, the catalog "Collection of Glyptics" was presented for publication, work on the book-album "Phaleristics in Azerbaijan" was completed.

At present, more than 32,000 materials are preserved in the Auxiliary Historical Materials Fund.

360 pieces in the "Glyptics" section.
2235 pieces in the "Phaleristics" section.
12,375 pieces in the "Bonistics" section.
More than 17,000 pieces in the "Philately" section.
1016 pieces in the "Special awards" section.

The fund has been headed by Associate Professor Sanuber Gasimova since 1998.

Fund of Gifts and Memorabilia 
"Fund of Gifts and Memorabilia" of the National Museum of History of Azerbaijan was founded in 2009 on the basis of some of the materials of the Fund of "Soviet period" established in 1955. There are currently 5665 exhibits in the fund. Nearly 1000 pieces of them are the ones, which were presented to our republic and directly to the National Museum of History of Azerbaijan. The gifts given by President of Russia Vladimir Putin, President of Turkey Turgut Ozal, King of Afghanistan Mohammed Zahir Shah, President of Indonesia Sukarno, President of Egypt Gamal Abdel Nasser, President of Turkmenistan Gurbanguly Malikgulievich Berdimuhamedow hold a special place among the fund's exhibits.

The fund's memorabilia include memorial collections belonging to oil entrepreneur, philanthropist Haji Zeynalabdin Taghiyev, poets and writers such as Huseyn Javid, Samad Vurgun, Rasul Rza, academicians Mirasadulla Mirgasimov, Yusif Mammadaliyev, Aliashraf Alizade, Hasan Abdullayev, Faramaz Maksudov, Ismayil Huseynov, composers Muslum Magomayev, the brothers Uzeyir and Zulfugar Hajibeyov, Fikret Amirov, Gara Garayev, composer-conductor Niyazi, actors and actresses Huseyngulu Sarabski, Sidgi Ruhulla, Alasgar Alakbarov, Marziyya Davudova, Ali Gurbanov, Leyla Badirbeyli, Aghasadig Garaybeyli, Hokuma Gurbanova, Hero of Socialist Labour Sabit Orujov, Suleyman Vazirov, Heroes of the Soviet Union Israfil Mammadov, Hazi Aslanov, Mehdi Huseynzade, Ziya Bunyadov, Military Minister of the ADR Samadagha Mehmandarov, State Inspector Nariman bey Narimanbeyli, one of the leaders of Azerbaijan National Democratic Movement, Former President of the Republic of Azerbaijan Abulfaz Elchibey and others.

The fund works on the description of exhibits, the preparation of thematic cards and scientific passports for relatively interesting and unique exhibits, the electronic certification of exhibits, compilation of catalogs as well as assisting creative organizations and individuals, picking materials for conservation and restoration including for the exhibitions being arranged in the museum.

The exhibition "Gifts from friendly countries" was held and the catalog in the same name was published on the basis of the fund's materials. The fund's materials were also widely used in compiling catalogs such as "Maestro Niyazi", "Golden fund of science", "Azerbaijani banners", "Azerbaijani generals", "Aziz Aliyev", "Theater life of Baku", "Oil chronicle of Azerbaijan".

Over the years, the foundation was managed by: Agha Rahimov (1955), Asker Abdullaev (1955–1957), Tofik Dadashev (1957–1958), Rovshana Gashimova (1958–1961), Mira Aliyarova (1961–1964), Zumrud Kuliyeva (1964–1970) ), Rena Safarova (from 1970 to the present).

Fund of Numismatics 
The Cabinet of Numismatics (later the Fund of Numismatics), established in 1920 as a part of the Department of Archaeology, History and Ethnography of the Azerbaijan History Museum thanks to the hard work of Yevgeny Alexandrovich Pakhomov (1880–1965), soon became the richest fund of the History Museum.

The fund had a collection of 103 coins in the first years of its existence, 4,734 coins in 1928 and 16,728 coins in 1939. At the present time, it is a united numismatic center in the Republic, where about 100,000 coins are kept, studied, and promoted.

Coins found and minted in the territory of the Republic of Azerbaijan are the main part of the fund. Coins belonging to the feudal states of Azerbaijan – the Shirvanshahs, the Sajids, the Salarids, the Shaddadids, the Ravvadids, Azerbaijani Atabegs, Kara Koyunlu and Agh Koyunlu states, the Safavids and Azerbaijani khanates are of special importance among them.

There are collections consisting of ancient and oriental coins, ancient Greek cities, Roman and Byzantine Empires, Hellenistic states (Seleucid, Parthian, Bactrian), Sassanids, Arab Caliphate, Seljuks, Ilkhanids, Jochi, Ottomans, Afshars, Gajars, Baburis and others. Coins were minted in the above-mentioned countries and found in the territory of Azerbaijan. There are also coins representing almost all countries of the world (Western Europe, Russia, India, China, etc.) in the fund.

The formation and subsequent success of Azerbaijani numismatics as a science relates to the activity of Yevgeny Pakhomov, the founder and long-term conservator of the Numismatic Fund. It was under his leadership that the first, random coin findings discovered in the territory of Azerbaijan were placed in the fund, registered, increased in number, researched, and published. Y. Pakhomov released more than 100 articles on the history, archaeology and numismatics of Azerbaijan, the publications named "Coin treasures of Azerbaijan and other republics, provinces and regions of the Caucasus", "Georgian coins", "Azerbaijani coins".

Department of Numismatics and Epigraphy was created in the museum by decision of Presidium of Academy of Sciences of Azerbaijan SSR in 1968 and Y. Pakhomov's student, Ali Muhammad оglu Rajabli was appointed as a head of the department and of the Numismatic Fund.

In addition to teaching at various educational institutions for more than 50 years, three PhD dissertations have been defended under the leadership of this scientist, who has scientific achievements and various awards. The students of the scientist Associate Professor Sanuber Gasimova and Aygun Mammadova are currently the employees of the National Museum of History of Azerbaijan.

Works of researchers of the last century (A. Rahimov, K. Golenko, S. Mustafayeva, I. Babayev, L. Azimova, N. Sinitsina) were composed referring to the materials of the Numismatic Fund.

The materials of the Numismatic Fund were reflected in the articles and candidacy dissertations presented for defense by G.Pirguliyeva, A.Guliyev, T.Guliyev, S.Gasimova, A.Mammadova and others in Azerbaijan.

Since 1998, non-coin materials (stamps, orders, medals, cards, personal awards, etc.) have been selected from the Numismatic Fund and the Fund of Auxiliary Historical Materials has been established based on them.

At present, with the efforts of the staff of the Fund of Numismatics and the "Numismatics and Epigraphy" scientific-fund department, the registration of the coins in the electronic certification program along with their promotion and investigation is under way.

Currently, the head of the Department of Numismatics and Epigraphy is Professor Ali Rajabli.

Fund of Documentary Sources 
The Fund of Documentary Sources was established in 1996 based on the scientific archive of the National Museum of History of Azerbaijan. Prior to the establishment of the fund, thematic plans of the exposition, reports on the work of archeological expeditions and museum staff, quotes from various publications, calendars and other documents were kept in the scientific archive. The first registration in the inventory book of the scientific archive was made on 20 November 1953. After the creation of the Fund of Documentary Sources, official documents reflecting the activities of the museum were handed over to the current archive.

In the collection of the fund, there are currently preserved various materials covering a long period from the beginning of the XIX century up to the present, including documents and photographs reflecting the development of Azerbaijani culture and education, science and literature, and the establishment of the national press. Among these documentary sources, there are many materials reflecting the meaningful life and activity of the famous public figure and philanthropist Haji Zeynal Abdin Tagiyev. Thus, the face of this influential figure can be seen in three photo albums. Personal collections of Mirza Fatali Akhundzadeh, Hasan bey Zardabi, Najaf bey Vazirov, Rashid bey Efendiyev, Teymur bey Bayramalibeyov and others being preserved in the relevant repositories of the fund, unique copies of "Molla Nasraddin" magazine and "Akinchi" newspaper published in the late 19th and early 20th centuries, "Life", "Irshad", "Igbal" and others media outlets, the documents of educational societies operating at that time, and the educational institutions attached to them are extremely necessary. The Koran, being kept in the fund and published in French in Paris in 1877, with the personal seal of the well-known Azerbaijani intellectual Abulfat bey Shakhtakhtinsky, is one of the rare pearls of the fund. Various documents about the activity of Baku University, a facsimile copy of the 16th century copy of the medieval epic of the Azerbaijani Turks "Kitabi Dadam Gorgud" being preserved in Dresden, enrich the collection of the fund.

Among the interesting examples of the collection of the fund, there are the documents and photographs concerning the establishment of the National Theater and its activities up to the present. The exhibits reflecting the work of Uzeyir Hajibeyli and Muslim Magomayev, and the prominent actors of the Azerbaijani stage are of special importance.

The fund also preserves many documents related to the formation and development of the oil industry and geological science in Azerbaijan. Examples of these documents are the albums "Pitoev and Kº Joint Stock Company" ("Pitoyev və Kº Səhmdar Cəmiyyəti"), "The photos of oilfields of trading houses of Benkendorf and Kº. Balakhani, 1896" ("Benkendorf və Kº Ticarət Evinin neft mədənlərinin təsvirləri. Balaxanı, 1896"), "25th anniversary of Nobel Brothers Oil Production Society (1879–1904)" ("Nobel Qardaşları Neft Hasilatı Cəmiyyətinin (1879–1904) XXV illiyi"), "30th anniversary of Nobel Brothers Oil Production Society (1879–1909)" ("Nobel Qardaşları Neft Hasilatı Cəmiyyətinin (1879–1909) XXX illiyi"), "The commissioning of the I area of Baku-Batumi kerosene pipeline" ("Bakı-Batumi ağ neft kəmərinin I sahəsinin işə salınması") with cartoons, tables, maps and illustrations, "Complex development of the offshore fields of Azerbaijan" ("Azərbaycanın dəniz yataqlarının kompleks işlənməsi"), "Covering the Ilich Bay with soil" ("İliç buxtasının torpaqla örtülməsi"), "Construction of the Shollar water pipeline" ("Şollar su kəmərinin tikintisi"), "Executive lines of the Petrovsk-Baku railway (1896–1902)" ("Petrovsk-Bakı xəttinin (1896–1902)").

There are also preserved the documents, photos and postcards of local and foreign companies engaged in oil production in Azerbaijan at the end of 19th and in the beginning of 20th centuries, and the collections of M. Abramovich, D. Golubyatnikov, I. Gubkin, L. Gurvich, F. Rustambeyov, Y. Mammadaliyev, S. Vazirov, A. Bagirova, A. Alizade, A. Yagubov, I. Huseynov and others. The document on the internship of the old oilman Piri Guliyev in the United States in 1925 is of a particular interest here.

Documents of historical significance of the Azerbaijan Democratic Republic are also a special collection of the fund. Among them, the "Declaration of Independence", which laid the foundation of modern Azerbaijani statehood and was written under the name "Treaty", is particularly noteworthy. The first professional Azerbaijani artist Azim Azimzadeh designed the photocopy of this historical document being kept in the fund in 1918, when the declaration was adopted.

Moreover, the original text of this document obtained from Azerbaijani immigrants and submitted to the museum in 2014 on the recommendation of the President of the Republic of Azerbaijan, and the written copies of the document translated into French are preserved in the fund of the museum. In general, in recent years, the fund has collected many materials of Republican figures and Azerbaijani youth sent abroad for education. In 2018, the letters were given to the collection of the fund reflecting the correspondence of the leader of our national movement Mammad Amin Rasulzadeh with the young representative of this ideology Suleyman Mehmet Tekiner in 1950.

Interesting articles of many full and corresponding members of the Azerbaijan Academy of Sciences, who worked in various fields of science, also have a special place in the relevant collections of the fund. The personal belongings of scientists who achieved great success in the field of medicine – Yakov Gindes, Fyodor Ilyin, Bahadir Gayibov, Mustafa Hajigasimov, the first president of the Azerbaijan Academy of Sciences Mirasadulla Mirgasimov and the first Azerbaijani ophthalmologist Sona Valikhanli are especially interesting. The collection of the first Azerbaijani topographer General Ibrahim agha Vakilov includes unique maps of that period, ethnographic photos, and rare exhibits.

The fund also preserves numerous materials of the activities of Azerbaijan on the front and the rear during the First and Second World Wars. The materials of the 416th Taganrog National Division, which arrived in Berlin during World War II and planted the victory flag over the Brandenburg Gate are particularly worth noting.

Many documents and photos of the political activities of national leader Heydar Aliyev both during the Soviet period and the years of independence are preserved in the fund. Three of them are particularly interesting – the application of Heydar Aliyev addressed to the director of the museum to work at the Museum of History of Azerbaijan after the graduation of the Nakhchivan Pedagogical College, a biography and a personnel registration form. In the collection of modern documents of the fund, there are also personal belongings of most of our citizens who died for the independence and territorial integrity of Azerbaijan.

Most of the rare maps that are kept in the different funds and library of the museum were handed over to the "Sector of maps" founded under the fund in 2014. At present, there are protected 19,222 depository items in the collection of the fund. Many collection examples of the Fund of Documentary Sources were used as a source in the preparation of catalogs and book-albums.

The fund was headed by Roza Pisarevskaya (1955–1965), Osman Efendiyev (1965–1970), Svetlana Medvedeva (1970–2008) and Mehriban Aliyeva (2008–2019). Currently, the head of the fund is Esmira Rahimova.

Fund of Weapons and Banners 
The Fund of Weapons and Banners was founded in 2009 based on the Fund of New History, established in 1955. Some 1575 depository items are preserved in the fund. Among them, there are examples of defense weapons, sidearms and firearms (helmets, shields, ringed weapons, armor, armlets and footwears, swords, daggers and maces, rifles, pistols, and cannons) produced in the Caucasus, including Azerbaijan, various Eastern countries, Europe, and Russia, as well as the banners of military divisions of the khanate period and different republics.

These weapons show the highest level of weapon production and the high professionalism of Azerbaijani gunsmiths. The materials of the fund are regularly exhibited in the exposition of the museum and various exhibitions, and in the exhibitions involving only the collection of the fund:

"Weapons and banners of the East" ("Şərq silahları və bayraqları") (1999), "Sword stabbed in the ground" ("Torpağa sancılmış qılınc") (2012), "I Azerbaijani International Exhibition of Defense Industry" ("I Azərbaycan Beynəlxalq Müdafiə Sənayesi sərgisi") (2014), "II Azerbaijani International Exhibition of Defense Industry" ("II Azərbaycan Beynəlxalq Müdafiə Sənayesi sərgisi") (2016), "III Azerbaijani International Exhibition of Defense Industry" ("III Azərbaycan Beynəlxalq Müdafiə Sənayesi sərgisi") (2018) organized by the Ministry of Defense Industry of Azerbaijan, exhibition organized in the city of Ganja (2014), exhibition dedicated to the 70th anniversary of World War II at the National Museum of History of Azerbaijan (2015), exhibition dedicated to the 95th anniversary of the National Museum of History of Azerbaijan (2015), "Shah Ismail-ruler and commander" ("Şah İsmayıl-hökmdar və sərkərdə") (2016), "The state of the Shirvanshahs" ("Şirvanşahlar dövləti") (2017), the exhibition of "National clothes of Azerbaijan" ("Azərbaycan milli geyimləri") (2017), exhibition dedicated to the 100th anniversary of the liberation of Baku by Caucasian Islamic Army (2018), the exhibition of "Outstanding figures of the Azerbaijan Democratic Republic" ("Azərbaycan Cümhuriyyətinin görkəmli xadimləri") (2018), the exhibition "Admiral J.Javadov. Life, War and Service" ("Admiral C.Cavadov. həyatı, döyüş və xidmət yolu") (2018), the exhibition "If I have an army, I have a country" ("Ordum varsa, yurdum var") (2018), the exhibition "Sheki is a museum itself" ("Şəki özü bir muzeydir") (2019), the exhibition of "Azerbaijan during the World War II" ("Azərbaycan II Dünya Müharibəsində") (2020).

These exhibits, which are the obvious examples of our national values, reflect our material culture and historical heritage in a number of international exhibitions, promote this heritage as well: the exhibitions of "Caravan: Azerbaijan. Land of Fire" ("Karvan: Azərbaycan odlar yurdu") in Stavanger, Norway in 2006–2007, "Pearls of Azerbaijan" ("Azərbaycan inciləri") in Rome, Italy in 2012, "Azerbaijan – Land of Eternal Fire" ("Azərbaycan- əbədi odlar diyarı") in Ostrava, the Czech Republic in 2012–2013, "Azerbaijan: Land of Miraculous Fire" ("Azərbaycan: möcüzəli Odlar yurdu") in Prague, Czech Republic in 2014–2016, "Azerbaijan during the Great Patriotic War" ("Azərbaycan Böyük Vətən müharibəsi dövründə") (2020) in Moscow in 2019 in the territory of National Economic Achievements.

On the basis of the fund materials, the book-albums of "Statehood in Azerbaijan and their symbols" ("Azərbaycanda dövlətçilik rəmzıəri") (2000), "Gems of the National Museum of History of Azerbaijan" ("Milli Azərbaycan Tarixi Muzeyinin inciləri") (2010), catalogs of "Banners of Azerbaijan" ("Azərbaycan bayraqları") (2005), "Defense weapons of Azerbaijan" ("Azərbaycan müdafiə silahları") (2012), "Sidearms and firearms of Azerbaijan" ("Azərbaycan soyuq və odlu silahları") ”(2016) were issued and the monograph of "Weapons of Medieval period of Azerbaijan" ("Azərbaycan orta əsr silahları") (2019), the booklet of "Keys of Azerbaijani cities" ("Azərbaycan orta əsr silahları") (2020) were published. Television programmes were made in various genres and theses and articles were presented in different republican and international conferences based on the materials of the Fund of Weapons and Banners.

The fund was headed by Fikret Suleymanov (1955–1965), Sara Jangirova (1965–2002), and Sevindj Vahabova (from 2002 until the present day), Currently, the head of the fund is Qatiba Hasanova (2021).

Fund of descriptive materials 
The Fund of "Illustration and Fine Arts", which was established in 2002 on the basis of paintings from other funds and departments, has been operating under the name of the Fund of "Descriptive Materials" since 2009. At the present time, as well as the drawings of Azerbaijani artists (Azim Azimzade, Maral Rahmanzadeh, Mikayil Abdullayev, Boyukagha Mirzazade, Tahir Salahov, Altay Hajiyev and others.), more than 1000 paintings of artists from European, Eastern countries and Russia are preserved in the fund. Among them, there are artworks trimmed with oil and watercolor on linen, wood, cardboard and paper including made by the methods of graphics, lithography, intarsia, encrustation, and mosaic, among others.
 
The basis of the fund contains some of the works from the collection of the Art Department, which was founded in the museum in 1925, and of the Picture Gallery created a year later. The works of Western, Eastern and Russian artists, which were presented to the museum from Moscow (The State Tretyakov Gallery) and Leningrad (Hermitage Museum) as a result of negotiations, were also added to the artworks obtained in consequence of collection work carried out by the museum staff and confiscation campaign of the Bolshevik government during those years. According to the information from 1928, there were 715 artworks in the western collection of the department of "Art" and 879 in its eastern collection. The exhibition of Western and Eastern artworks was held in the museum in 1926–27. In the same year, V.M. Zummer was appointed head of the department, the museum artist Moris Fabri head and conservator of the Department of Eastern "Art", V.A. Obolenski head of Mobile exhibitions. Reconstruction works, which were launched at the beginning of 1930's, were ended up with the adoption of decision within the museum on establishing independent museums on basis of the museum's Departments of Theater and Art. In May 1935, the Art Museum became Artistic Gallery under the Azerbaijan State Museum in accordance with the order of People's Commissariat of Education. Although the Art Museum began functioning as an independent establishment by becoming Azerbaijan State Museum under the decision of People's Commissariat of Education dated 31 March 1936, it was still located in the Taghiyev mansion called "House of Museums" at those times. The examples of painting, sculpture including other artworks of the department of Art of the Azerbaijan State Museum were given to the newly founded museum. Only a few of the works directly related to the history (for example, "The invasion of Elisabethpol", "The invasion of Lankaran" by F. Roubaud, several works of A. Azimzade and so on) remained in the Azerbaijan Historical Museum.

At present, the Fund of "Descriptive Materials" operating in the museum contains those works as well as artistic paintings, statues and other artworks mainly concerning the history and obtained by the ways of collecting and ordering. Those works are displayed in the museum's permanent exposition and the exhibitions organized by the museum.

In 2012, the exhibition "The works of Azerbaijani painters in the Museum's collection" was arranged on the basis of materials of that fund. During 2002–2019, Rasim Sultanov was the head of the fund, and since 2019, the fund has been run by Associate Professor Nardana Yusifova.

Fund of photo-negative materials

Restoration laboratory 
Restoration of the museum's exhibits has been carried out since the establishment of the Museum of History of Azerbaijan. In the beginning, archaeological findings were primarily being restored and conserved. However, as the museum's collection was enriched with various exhibits, there was a necessity to involve restorer-specialists majored in different fields. Most employees of the laboratory have many years of restoration experience and education. At present, there are 13 workers specialized in metal, ceramics, wood, textile (carpet and embroidery), painting and graphics in the laboratory. To improve their professional skills, the employees of the laboratory regularly refer to a variety of new publications concerning the issues of restoration and conservation and apply advanced methods to their work. The activity of the laboratory was presented at the exhibition of "The second life of Museum's exhibits" held in the museum in 2010.

See also 
 Zeynalabdin Taghiyev

References

External links 

 

1920 establishments in Azerbaijan
History museums in Azerbaijan
Archaeological museums in Azerbaijan
Ethnographic museums in Azerbaijan
Museums established in 1920
Museums in Baku
National museums of Azerbaijan